Maziarnia may refer to the following places:
Maziarnia, Chełm County in Lublin Voivodeship (east Poland)
Maziarnia, Tomaszów Lubelski County in Lublin Voivodeship (east Poland)
Maziarnia, Nisko County in Subcarpathian Voivodeship (south-east Poland)
Maziarnia, Stalowa Wola County in Subcarpathian Voivodeship (south-east Poland)